Joseph Humphrey Sloss (October 12, 1826 – January 27, 1911) was an American politician who served the state of Alabama in the U.S. House of Representatives between 1871 and 1875. He was born in Somerville, Morgan County, Alabama on October 12, 1826. He studied law, was admitted to the bar, and entered practice in St. Louis, Missouri. He moved to Edwardsville, Illinois in 1849, and served in 1858 and 1859 as a member of the Illinois House of Representatives. Sloss returned to Alabama, and during the Civil War served in the Confederate Army. He served as mayor of Tuscumbia, Alabama, was elected in 1870 as a Democrat to the U.S. House of Representatives, and was reelected in 1872, but was defeated for reelection in 1874. He was appointed in 1877 as United States marshal for the northern district of Alabama, serving until 1882; and served as clerk of the U.S. federal court at Huntsville. Sloss moved to Memphis, Tennessee, and died there on January 27, 1911. He is buried in Maple Hill Cemetery in Huntsville, Alabama.

References

External links

 

1826 births
1911 deaths
Democratic Party members of the Illinois House of Representatives
United States Marshals
People from Tuscumbia, Alabama
People from Morgan County, Alabama
Democratic Party members of the United States House of Representatives from Alabama
19th-century American politicians